Tomentaurum is a genus of Mexican plants in the sunflower family. It is native to the Sierra Madre Occidental in the west-central part of the State of Chihuahua.

Species
There is only one known species, Tomentaurum niveum.

References

Astereae
Monotypic Asteraceae genera
Flora of Chihuahua (state)